Augusto Bruno da Silva, known as Augusto (born 22 February 1992) is a Brazilian football player. He played in Ukraine for FC Lviv.

Club career
He made his Ukrainian Premier League debut for FC Lviv on 22 July 2018 in a game against FC Arsenal Kyiv.

References

External links
 

1992 births
Footballers from São Paulo
Living people
Brazilian footballers
Association football midfielders
Guaratinguetá Futebol players
FC Lviv players
Ukrainian Premier League players
Brazilian expatriate footballers
Expatriate footballers in Ukraine